A B-H Analyzer is an instrument that measures the AC magnetic characteristics of soft magnetic materials. It measures residual flux density BR and coercive force HC. It has applications in manufacturing magnetic-related products such as hard disks and magnetic tape, and in analysis of cast irons.

See also
 B field and H field
 Magnetic hysteresis
 Saturation (magnetic)

References

External links
Photograph of the SY-8218, a common B-H Analyzer

Magnetism
Measuring instruments
Laboratory equipment
Scientific equipment